Soumik Sen is an Indian screenwriter and film director. He has written the screenplay for films such as 
Anthony Kaun Hai? (2006), Ru Ba Ru and  Meerabai Not Out (2008) and Hum Tum Aur Ghost (2010). In 2014 he directed and wrote the screenplay and composed the songs of the crime film Gulaab Gang. Sen's debut picture was described by Indiatimes as "full of self deprecating humour and quiet confidence that stems from his script and leading lady, Madhuri Dixit-Nene". He directed and composed songs for the 2019 release Why Cheat India. He has also directed a Bengali film, "Mahalaya", the biopic of Birendra Krishna Bhadra, produced by Nideas.

In celebration of the 100th anniversary of Indian cinema, Sen was one of the top figures selected by CNN-IBN to draw up The 100 greatest Indian films of all time.

Bollywood discography

References

External links
 
 http://www.spectralhues.com/entertainment/celebrity-interview/2014/03/spectralhues-speaks-gulaab-gang-director-soumik-sen/

Indian male screenwriters
Hindi-language film directors
Living people
Year of birth missing (living people)
Film directors from West Bengal